Lawrence P. Williams (10 August 1905 — 8 October 1996) was a British motion picture art director. He was born in
Slough, Buckinghamshire (now Berkshire).

Filmography
 So Well Remembered (1947)
 Brief Encounter (1945) (as L.P. Williams)
 Forever and a Day (1943) (uncredited)
 Sunny (1941)
 No, No, Nanette (1940) (as L.P. Williams)
 Irene (1940) (as L.P. Williams)
 Nurse Edith Cavell (1939)
 Sixty Glorious Years (1938) (as L.P. Williams)
 A Yank at Oxford (1938) (as L.P. Williams)
 Victoria the Great (1937)
 Our Fighting Navy (1937)
 The Queen's Affair (1934)
 Nell Gwyn (1934) (as L.P. Williams)
 Yes, Mr. Brown (1933) (as L.P. Williams)
 The King's Cup (1933)
 Thark (1932)
 A Night Like This (1932)
 Plunder (1931)
 Carnival (1931) (as L. P. Williams)
 The Speckled Band (1931) (as L.P. Williams)
 Canaries Sometimes Sing (1930)
 School for Scandal (1930)
 Tons of Money (1930)
 On Approval (1930)
 Wolves (1930)

Art department
 Mr. & Mrs. Smith (1941) (associate art director) (as L.P. Williams)
 Tom Brown's School Days (1940) (associate art director) (as L.P. Williams)
 Vigil in the Night (1940) (associate art director) (as L.P. Williams)
 The Loves of Robert Burns (1930) (assistant art director)
 The Woman in White (1929) (assistant art director)
 The Bondman (1929) (assistant art director)
 When Knights Were Bold (1929) (assistant art director)

External links
 
 Art & Design in The British Film #30- Lawrence Paul Williams

1905 births
1996 deaths
English art directors
English male film actors
People from Slough
20th-century English male actors